Bathyeliasona kirkegaardi is a deep-sea scale worm which is only known to occur in the Pacific Ocean, where it is recorded from a depth range of about 5,500–8,000 m.

Description
Bathyeliasona kirkegaardi has 17 segments, with 8 pairs of elytra and no pigmentation. The anterior margin of the prostomium comprises a pair of acute anterior projection and the lateral antennae are absent. 
The notochaetae are thinner than the neurochaetae, with bidentate neurochaetae absent.

References

Phyllodocida